Blackwater, New Mexico is the designation of a HVDC back-to-back facility for the power exchange between the asynchronous power grids of Texas and New Mexico. It was built by Brown Boveri in 1985 and can transfer a power up to 200 megawatts. The used voltage is 57 kV.

Energy infrastructure completed in 1985
Energy infrastructure in Texas
Energy infrastructure in New Mexico
Western Interconnection